Benton County is a county located in the west central part of the U.S. state of Missouri. The population was 19,394 as of the 2020 Census. Its county seat is Warsaw. The county was organized January 3, 1835, and named for U.S. Senator Thomas Hart Benton of Missouri.

Geography

Adjacent counties
Pettis County  (north)
Morgan County  (northeast)
Camden County  (southeast)
Hickory County  (south)
St. Clair County  (southwest)
Henry County  (west)

Major highways
 U.S. Route 65
 Route 7
 Route 83
 Route 82
 Route 52

Demographics

As of the census of 2000, there were 17,180 people, 7,420 households, and 5,179 families residing in the county.  The population density was 24 people per square mile (9/km2).  There were 12,691 housing units at an average density of 18 per square mile (7/km2).  The racial makeup of the county was 97.96% White, 0.15% Black or African American, 0.53% Native American, 0.13% Asian, 0.01% Pacific Islander, 0.12% from other races, and 1.10% from two or more races. Approximately 0.89% of the population were Hispanic or Latino of any race.

There were 7,420 households, out of which 23.20% had children under the age of 18 living with them, 59.60% were married couples living together, 6.80% had a female householder with no husband present, and 30.20% were non-families. 26.30% of all households were made up of individuals, and 13.80% had someone living alone who was 65 years of age or older.  The average household size was 2.28 and the average family size was 2.72.

In the county, the population was spread out, with 20.50% under the age of 18, 5.70% from 18 to 24, 21.80% from 25 to 44, 29.70% from 45 to 64, and 22.30% who were 65 years of age or older.  The median age was 46 years. For every 100 females there were 98.20 males.  For every 100 females age 18 and over, there were 96.70 males.

The median income for a household in the county was $26,646, and the median income for a family was $32,459. Males had a median income of $26,203 versus $19,054 for females. The per capita income for the county was $15,457.  About 10.20% of families and 15.70% of the population were below the poverty line, including 24.50% of those under age 18 and 9.60% of those age 65 or over.

Religion
According to the Association of Religion Data Archives County Membership Report (2010), Benton County is a part of the Bible Belt, with evangelical Protestantism being the most predominant religion. The most predominant denominations among residents in Benton County who adhere to a religion are Southern Baptists (38.72%), Lutherans (LCMS) (19.06%), and United Methodists (14.49%).

2020 Census

Education

Public schools
Cole Camp R-I School District – Cole Camp
Cole Camp Elementary School (PK-05)
Cole Camp Middle School (06-08)
Cole Camp High School (09-12)
Lincoln R-II School District – Lincoln
Lincoln Elementary School (K-06)
Lincoln High School (07-12)
Warsaw R-IX School District – Warsaw
North Elementary School (PK-05)
South Elementary School (PK-05)
John Boise Middle School (06-08)
Warsaw High School (09-12)

Private schools
Lutheran School Association – Cole Camp (K-08) – Lutheran
Most of the students who attend Cole Camp's Lutheran School Association attend Benton County R-1 High in Cole Camp.

Public libraries
Boonslick Regional Library

Politics

Local
The Republican Party controls politics at the local level in Benton County. Republicans hold every elected position in the county.

State

Benton County is split between two of Missouri's legislative districts that elect members of the Missouri House of Representatives. Both are represented by Republicans.

District 57 — Rodger Reedy (R-Windsor). Consists of the northern half of the county, including Cole Camp, Ionia, and Lincoln.

  
District 125 — Jim Kalberloh (R-Lowry City). Consists of the southern half of the county, including Edwards and Warsaw.

All of Benton County is a part of Missouri's 28th District in the Missouri Senate, which is represented by Sandy Crawford (R-Buffalo). A previous incumbent, Mike Parson, was elected Lieutenant Governor in 2016 and became Governor in 2018 following the resignation of Eric Greitens.

Federal
All of Benton County is included in Missouri's 4th Congressional District and is currently represented by Vicky Hartzler (R-Harrisonville) in the U.S. House of Representatives. Hartzler was elected to a sixth term in 2020 over Democratic challenger Lindsey Simmons.

Benton County, along with the rest of the state of Missouri, is represented in the U.S. Senate by Josh Hawley (R-Columbia) and Roy Blunt (R-Strafford).

Blunt was elected to a second term in 2016 over then-Missouri Secretary of State Jason Kander.

Political culture

At the presidential level, Benton County is solidly Republican. Benton County strongly favored Donald Trump in both 2016 and 2020. Bill Clinton was the last Democratic presidential nominee to carry Benton County in 1996 with a plurality of the vote, and a Democrat hasn't won majority support from the county's voters in a presidential election since Franklin Roosevelt in 1932.

Like most rural areas throughout Missouri, voters in Benton County generally adhere to socially and culturally conservative principles which tend to influence their Republican leanings. Despite Benton County's longstanding tradition of supporting socially conservative platforms, voters in the county have a penchant for advancing populist causes. In 2018, Missourians voted on a proposition (Proposition A) concerning right to work, the outcome of which ultimately reversed the right to work legislation passed in the state the previous year. 64.74% of Benton County voters cast their ballots to overturn the law.

Missouri presidential preference primaries

2020
The 2020 presidential primaries for both the Democratic and Republican parties were held in Missouri on March 10. On the Democratic side, former Vice President Joe Biden (D-Delaware) both won statewide and carried Benton County by a wide margin. Biden went on to defeat President Donald Trump in the general election.

Incumbent President Donald Trump (R-Florida) faced a primary challenge from former Massachusetts Governor Bill Weld, but won both Benton County and statewide by overwhelming margins.

2016
The 2016 presidential primaries for both the Republican and Democratic parties were held in Missouri on March 15. Businessman Donald Trump (R-New York) narrowly won the state overall but carried a majority of the vote in Benton County. He went on to win the presidency.

On the Democratic side, former Secretary of State Hillary Clinton (D-New York) narrowly won statewide and carried a majority in Benton County.

2012
The 2012 Missouri Republican Presidential Primary's results were nonbinding on the state's national convention delegates. Voters in Benton County supported former U.S. Senator Rick Santorum (R-Pennsylvania), who finished first in the state at large, but eventually lost the nomination to former Governor Mitt Romney (R-Massachusetts). Delegates to the congressional district and state conventions were chosen at a county caucus, which selected a delegation favoring Santorum. Incumbent President Barack Obama easily won the Missouri Democratic Primary and renomination. He defeated Romney in the general election.

2008
In 2008, the Missouri Republican Presidential Primary was closely contested, with Senator John McCain (R-Arizona) prevailing and eventually winning the nomination. However, former Governor Mike Huckabee (R-Arkansas) won a slim plurality in Benton County.

Then-Senator Hillary Clinton (D-New York) received more votes than any candidate from either party in Benton County during the 2008 presidential primary. Despite initial reports that Clinton had won Missouri, Barack Obama (D-Illinois), also a Senator at the time, narrowly defeated her statewide and later became that year's Democratic nominee, going on to win the presidency.

Communities

Cities
Cole Camp
Lincoln
Warsaw (county seat)

Village
Ionia

Census-designated places
Bent Tree Harbor
White Branch

Townships

 Alexander
 Cole
 Fristoe
 North Lindsey
 South Lindsey
 Tom
 Union
 White
 Williams

Other communities

 Avery
 Bentonville
 Brandon
 Cold Springs
 Crest
 Crockerville
 Dell
 Dell Junction
 Edmonson
 Edwards
 Fristoe
 Hastain
 Knobby
 Lake Creek
 Lakeview Heights
 Lively
 Majorville
 Mora
 Mount Hulda
 Palo Pinto
 Racket
 Santiago
 Tackner
 Valley View
 Whitakerville
 Wisdom
 Zora

Notable people
 Martin Heinrich - U.S. Senator (D-New Mexico) (2013-present), U.S. Representative (D-New Mexico) (2009-2013) 
 Stan Kroenke- owner of Los Angeles Rams, Denver Nuggets, Colorado Avalanche, and majority owner of Arsenal

See also
National Register of Historic Places listings in Benton County, Missouri

References

Further reading
 History of Cole, Moniteau, Morgan, Benton, Miller, Maries and Osage counties, Missouri : from the earliest time to the present, including a department devoted to the preservation of sundry personal, business, professional and the private records; besides a valuable fund of notes, original observations, etc. etc. (1889) online

External links
http://www.hearthstonelegacy.com/benton.htm
Benton County Courthouse Official Website
 Digitized 1930 Plat Book of Benton County  from University of Missouri Division of Special Collections, Archives, and Rare Books

 
Missouri counties
1835 establishments in Missouri
Populated places established in 1835